Caprogammarus is a genus of crustaceans belonging to the monotypic family Caprogammaridae.

Species:

Caprogammarus gurjanove 
Caprogammarus micropleopodus

References

Amphipoda